The canton of Grand Couronné is an administrative division of the Meurthe-et-Moselle department, northeastern France. It was created at the French canton reorganisation which came into effect in March 2015. Its seat is in Laneuveville-devant-Nancy.

It consists of the following communes:

Agincourt
Amance
Art-sur-Meurthe
Bouxières-aux-Chênes
Buissoncourt
Cerville
Champenoux
Dommartin-sous-Amance
Erbéviller-sur-Amezule
Eulmont
Gellenoncourt
Haraucourt
Laître-sous-Amance
Laneuvelotte
Laneuveville-devant-Nancy
Lenoncourt
Mazerulles
Moncel-sur-Seille
Pulnoy
Réméréville
Saulxures-lès-Nancy
Seichamps
Sornéville
Velaine-sous-Amance

References

Cantons of Meurthe-et-Moselle